WDR Event is a German, public radio station owned and operated by the Westdeutscher Rundfunk (WDR).

References

Westdeutscher Rundfunk
Radio stations in Germany
Radio stations established in 2006
2006 establishments in Germany
Mass media in Cologne